Takev Point, Foyn Coast
 Talaskara Ridge, Alexander Island
 Talev Glacier, Graham Coast 
 Tambra Island, Biscoe Islands
 Tangra Mountains, Livingston Island  
 Tarakchiev Point, Davis Coast  
 Taralezh Island, Wilhelm Archipelago
 Taran Plateau, Brabant Island
 Targovishte Glacier, Greenwich Island 
 Taridin Ridge, Oscar II Coast
 Tarnovo Ice Piedmont, Livingston Island  
 Tashukov Nunatak, Nordenskjöld Coast
 Tatarchev Nunatak, Oscar II Coast
 Tatul Island, Robert Island 
 Tegra Nunatak, Alexander Island 
 Telerig Nunatak, Greenwich Island 
 Telish Rock, Livingston Island 
 Temenuga Island, Anvers Island 
 Tepava Ridge, Oscar II Coast
 Teres Ridge, Livingston Island
 Terimer Point, Greenwich Island  
 Terter Peak, Greenwich Island  
 Tervel Peak, Livingston Island 
 Teshel Cove, Low Island  
 Teteven Glacier, Greenwich Island  
 Thamyris Glacier, Anvers Island 
 Thompson Hill, Alexander Island 
 Ticha Peak, Livingston Island 
 Tigan Island, Wilhelm Archipelago
 Tikale Peak, Oscar II Coast 
 Tile Ridge, Greenwich Island  
 Timok Cove, Rugged Island  
 Tintyava Peak, Trinity Peninsula
 Tipits Knoll, Alexander Island 
 Tirizis Island, Robert Island
 Tizoin Point, Trinity Island
 Tlachene Cove, Loubet Coast
 Todorova Island, Biscoe Islands
 Toledo Island, Livingston Island
 Topola Ridge, Davis Coast
 Toros Peak, Sentinel Range  
 Trajan Gate, Trinity Peninsula  
 Trakiya Heights, Trinity Peninsula  
 Trambesh Peak, Brabant Island
 Tran Crag, Livingston Island 
 Transmarisca Bay, Krogh Island
 Trave Peak, Nordenskjöld Coast 
 Travnik Buttress, Oscar II Coast
 Trebishte Island, Anvers Island 
 Treklyano Island, Robert Island 
 Trepetlika Glacier, Danco Coast 
 Treskavets Glacier, Clarence Island
 Triangulation Beach, Nelson Island
 Trifonov Point, Elephant Island
 Trigrad Gap, Livingston Island  
 Triznatsi Rocks, Nelson Island
 Troughton Rocks, Snow Island
 Troyan Peak, Livingston Island  
 Tryavna Peak, Livingston Island  
 Tsamblak Hill, Livingston Island
 Tsankov Island, Wilhelm Archipelago
 Tsarevets Buttress, Trinity Peninsula  
 Tsarigrad Peak, Smith Island 
 Tsepina Cove, Robert Island
 Mount Tsotsorkov, Danco Coast
 Tuida Cove, Nelson Island 
 Tumba Ice Cap, Graham Land  
 Tundzha Glacier, Livingston Island  
 Tutrakan Peak, Livingston Island  
 Tvarditsa Rocks, Greenwich Island
 Tyulen Island, Wilhelm Archipelago

See also 
 Bulgarian toponyms in Antarctica

External links 
 Bulgarian Antarctic Gazetteer
 SCAR Composite Gazetteer of Antarctica
 Antarctic Digital Database (ADD). Scale 1:250000 topographic map of Antarctica with place-name search.
 L. Ivanov. Bulgarian toponymic presence in Antarctica. Polar Week at the National Museum of Natural History in Sofia, 2–6 December 2019

Bibliography 
 J. Stewart. Antarctica: An Encyclopedia. Jefferson, N.C. and London: McFarland, 2011. 1771 pp.  
 L. Ivanov. Bulgarian Names in Antarctica. Sofia: Manfred Wörner Foundation, 2021. Second edition. 539 pp.  (in Bulgarian)
 G. Bakardzhieva. Bulgarian toponyms in Antarctica. Paisiy Hilendarski University of Plovdiv: Research Papers. Vol. 56, Book 1, Part A, 2018 – Languages and Literature, pp. 104-119 (in Bulgarian)
 L. Ivanov and N. Ivanova. Bulgarian names. In: The World of Antarctica. Generis Publishing, 2022. pp. 114-115. 

Antarctica
 
Bulgarian toponyms in Antarctica
Names of places in Antarctica